{{DISPLAYTITLE:C26H33NO2}}
The molecular formula C26H33NO2 (molar mass: 391.54 g/mol) may refer to:

 Abiraterone acetate, an antiandrogen medication used to treat prostate cancer
 Fenretinide, a synthetic retinoid derivative